Ben Taylor-Matthews (born 27 July 1984) is a professional British Real Tennis player based at Bristol Real Tennis Club. His career high ranking is world number 4, and his current ranking is 4. As of June 2016, he is also the British number 1. To date, he is yet to win a major singles title but has contested two Australian Open finals, as well as an IRTPA Championships final, plus a Champions Trophy final. In 2010 he won the US Open doubles championship, partnered by Steve Virgona.

He contested in the 2012 World Championship eliminators, the sports biggest prize, which takes only the top four players over a two-year period leading up to the challenge itself. He was defeated in the first round of eliminators but became the first player ever to force a deciding match.

Notes

1984 births
Living people
English real tennis players
Place of birth missing (living people)